The Filene Research Institute is an American credit union and consumer finance think tank headquartered in Madison, Wisconsin.

History and objective
Founded in 1989, it is committed to research and innovation to further the credit union movement and support consumer financial wellbeing.  The institute is named for Edward Filene, a Boston, Massachusetts-based businessman and philanthropist who was instrumental in the creation of credit unions in the U.S.

In 1993, the institute published a research report on the evolution of credit union field of membership, helping to lay the groundwork for H.R 1151, the Credit Union Membership Access Act.

In 2003, the institute started the REAL Solutions project to study financial services for low-income households and address predatory lending and other fringe financial services.  The project became a program of the National Credit Union Foundation in 2007.

In 2004, the institute launched an innovation training program called i3 (for "Ideas, Innovation, Implementation"), which brings together credit union executives to identify new solutions and business models in financial services.

In 2010, the institute established the Cooperative Trust program and community to support credit union young professionals. In 2017, the Cooperative Trust was awarded the Herb Wegner Memorial Outstanding Program Award by the National Credit Union Foundation 

The institute engages several prominent academic researchers, including:

Sekou Bermiss
Dennis Campbell
Robert Hoel
William E. Jackson
Jinkook Lee
Robert D. Manning
Bill Maurer
Hayagreeva "Huggy" Rao
Quinetta Roberson
Barbara J. Robles
J. Edward Russo
Hope Schau
Lisa J. Servon
Peter Tufano
James A. Wilcox

Partnerships
In early 2012, it partnered with Saveup; a company which rewards fiscal responsibility.

The institute is a grantee of the Center for Financial Services Innovation.

The institute has also been supported by the Ford Foundation and Visa to conduct research on financial services for households of color, including Latino/a and immigrant households.

See also

List of credit unions in the United States
List of think tanks in the United States

References

External links
filene.org, the institute's official website

1989 establishments in the United States
Companies based in Madison, Wisconsin
Banks established in 1989
Credit unions based in Wisconsin
Non-profit organizations based in Wisconsin
Political and economic think tanks in the United States